Sir Arthur Hallam Rice Elton, 10th Baronet (10 February 1906 – 1 January 1973) was a pioneer of the British documentary film industry.

Educated at Marlborough College and Jesus College, Cambridge, he was a schoolfriend of John Betjeman. After graduation, he worked as a scriptwriter in England and Germany, and in 1931 was recruited into the Empire Marketing Board Film Unit (later the GPO Film Unit) by John Grierson. He worked as a director and producer on many films over the next two decades, mainly for the government, though 1932's Voice of the World was sponsored by His Master's Voice, the first example of industrial sponsorship of a documentary film. During the Second World War he became supervisor of films at the Ministry of Information, and afterwards he became an advisor to the Shell Petroleum Company and production head of Shell Films.

Elton married Margaret Ann Bjornson (d.1995) in 1948. On inheriting the Elton Baronetcy title and Clevedon Court on the death of his father in 1951, Elton restored the building and donated it to the National Trust in lieu of death duties. He took a keen interest in the town of Clevedon, becoming chairman of the printing company which produced the local paper.  He was also prominent in the campaign to restore Clevedon Pier.

On Elton's death, his collection of material relating to British industrial development (valued at over a quarter of a million pounds) was given to the Ironbridge Museum.  He was succeeded by his son Charles, who is a television producer.

External links

See also 
Edgar Anstey
Alberto Cavalcanti
John Grierson
Humphrey Jennings
Paul Rotha
Basil Wright

References 
Jonathan Dawson Arthur Elton in: Ian Aitken (ed) Encyclopedia of the Documentary Film, NY Routledge, 2006, pp. 56–61 .

1906 births
1973 deaths
Alumni of Jesus College, Cambridge
Baronets in the Baronetage of Great Britain
English film directors
English male screenwriters
People educated at Marlborough College
British documentary filmmakers
Civil servants in the General Post Office
British documentary film producers
20th-century English screenwriters
20th-century English male writers